Katie Telford (born 1978) is a Canadian political strategist who is the Chief of Staff to Prime Minister Justin Trudeau. She served as Trudeau's chief campaign advisor during his successful campaign in the 2015 election. Following the resignation of Gerald Butts, Telford has been acknowledged as holding the highest-ranking position within the Prime Minister's Office and held critical leadership roles in the 2019 and 2021 Liberal election campaigns. Telford was also influential in Canada's response to the COVID-19 pandemic, and the negotiations of the March 2022 Liberal-NDP supply and confidence agreement.

Early life and education
Telford was raised in Toronto. Her parents were public servants; her father was Australian and her mother was from Hamilton, Ontario.

When Telford was 12, she worked as a page for several weeks in the Ontario legislature. She studied political science at the University of Ottawa, where she joined the debate club and ultimately became the club's president. The team was a two-time national semi-finalist and finished high at the world championship event in Glasgow, Scotland.

Career

From 2004 to 2006, Telford was chief of staff to Ontario Education Minister Gerard Kennedy and headed his campaign in the 2006 Liberal Party of Canada leadership election. She later served as deputy chief of staff for Liberal leader Stéphane Dion, and worked as a consultant for StrategyCorp in Toronto between her positions with Dion and Trudeau.

On September 21, 2016, The Globe and Mail reported that Telford had charged moving expenses to Canadian taxpayers in the amount of $80,382.55 to relocate her residence from Toronto to Ottawa. These expenses included a personalized cash payout of $23,373.71. After it was revealed publicly, Telford agreed to repay a portion of the $80,382.55.

Telford was accused of a conflict of interest when it was revealed that her husband's firm received $84 million to manage the rent assistance aid program. This accusation was dismissed by the Lobbying Commissioner.

Following the resignation of Gerald Butts, Principal Secretary to Prime Minister Justin Trudeau, in February 2019, Telford's political influence over the government and party was significantly elevated. 

Telford testified to a House of Commons committee regarding sexual assault allegations in the Canadian Armed Forces and the WE Charity scandal. 

Telford has also been called by members of the media and opposition parties to testify about alleged Chinese interference in the 2019 and 2021 federal elections, as of March 2023.

Personal life
Telford is married to Rob Silver, a consultant for a public affairs agency and former regular Power & Politics panelist. They have one son.

References

External links
 

1978 births
Canadian campaign managers
Canadian people of Australian descent
Canadian political commentators
Canadian political consultants
Canadian women in federal politics
Chiefs of staff of the Canadian Prime Minister's Office
Living people
People from Toronto
University of Ottawa alumni